BC Ferries operates three Intermediate-class ferries:

MV Queen of Capilano (1991)
 100 vehicles since Jan 2015 mid-life refit
 462 passengers
 96 metre length
 2,500 gross tons
 12.5 kts
 7305 HP
 Route: Horseshoe Bay ↔ Bowen Island

MV Queen of Cumberland (1992)
 112 vehicles 
 462 passengers
 96 metre length
 2,662 gross tons
 12.5 kts
 7305 HP
 Route: Swartz Bay ↔ Southern Gulf Islands

 (2008)
 Was renamed from MV Island Sky on October 24, 2019
 125 vehicles
 450 passengers
 102 metres length
 3,397 gross tons
 15.5 kts
 7094 HP
 Route: Earl's Cove ↔ Saltery Bay

All three ferries were built at Vancouver Shipyards of the Washington Marine Group in North Vancouver, British Columbia.

References

External links
  Queen of Capilano
  Queen of Cumberland
  Malaspina Sky

 
Ships built in British Columbia
Ferry classes